USS Groton (SSN-694), the seventh , was the third ship of the United States Navy to be named for Groton, Connecticut. The contract to build her was awarded to the Electric Boat Division of General Dynamics Corporation in Groton, Connecticut on 31 January 1971 and her keel was laid down on 3 August 1973. She was launched on 9 October 1976 sponsored by Mrs. Anne Francis Richardson (née Hazard), wife of Secretary of Commerce Elliot L. Richardson, and commissioned on 8 July 1978, with Commander R. William Vogel, III in command and Master Chief Petty Officer Joseph Pow as Chief of the Boat.

Groton departed on her first overseas deployment in March 1980 to the Indian Ocean. The submarine made her way back to the homeport of Groton, Connecticut by way of the Panama Canal. Groton completed the Around-the-World Cruise in October 1980.

Groton was decommissioned and stricken from the Naval Vessel Register on 7 November 1997. Ex-Groton was scheduled to enter the Nuclear Powered Ship and Submarine Recycling Program in Bremerton, Washington 1 October 2011.

References 

This article includes information collected from the Naval Vessel Register as well as various press releases and news stories.

Ships built in Groton, Connecticut
Los Angeles-class submarines
Cold War submarines of the United States
Nuclear submarines of the United States Navy
1976 ships